Van de Woestijne is a Flemish surname. Notable people with the surname include:
 Gustave Van de Woestijne (1881–1947), Belgian painter
 Karel van de Woestijne (1878–1929), Flemish writer, brother of Gustave
 Maximilien Van de Woestijne (1911-2000), Belgian Painter.
 François III Maximilien de la Woestyne, 3rd Marquess of Becelaere (died 1794)